Three's a Crowd is a 1969 American made-for-television comedy film starring Larry Hagman, who was starring in the hit sitcom I Dream of Jeannie at the time. The film was directed by Harry Falk for Screen Gems, the production company behind I Dream of Jeannie.  The film's title tune was written, performed and produced by Boyce and Hart, who wrote and produced several of the Monkees' hits as well as songs for Little Anthony and the Imperials, Del Shannon, Fats Domino, Paul Revere and the Raiders, Chubby Checker and the theme song to Days of Our Lives. The duo also appeared with Hagman in an episode of I Dream of Jeannie. The film originally aired as the ABC Movie of the Week on December 2, 1969
.

Plot
Jim Carson (Larry Hagman) is a pilot whose wife Ann (E.J. Peaker) disappears and is presumed dead. Seven years later, she re-appears.  Meantime, Jim has met and married Jessica (Jessica Walter). He really loves both wives and hasn't the heart to tell either one of them about the other. They both throw a birthday party for him at the same time and in the same hotel, but on different floors.  He tries to get away with his charade and finally enlists the aid of the elevator boy (Norman Fell). Jim goes to a psychiatrist (Harvey Korman) to try to figure out his "problem". The psychiatrist drools over both wives's pictures and tells Jim what a fool he is to want to give them up. Jim, who runs an air freight service between two cities, spends one night with Ann and the next with Jessica. Both women are physically active, having him doing all kinds of sports, and are just wearing him to a frazzle.  That's when he goes to see the psychiatrist.

Cast 
 Larry Hagman as Jim Carson
 Jessica Walter as Jessica Carson
 E. J. Peaker as Ann Carson
 Harvey Korman as Doctor Pike
 Farrah Fawcett as Hitchhiker
 Norman Fell as Norman, the Elevator Operator
 Stu Gilliam as Ralph Wilcox
 Mickey Deems as Drunk
 Shelley Morrison as Mona
 Alfred Dennis as Rico
 Roy Stuart as Buzzy Grant
 Ken Greenwald	as George Fowler
 Sue Taylor as Fran Preeble
 Michael Lerner as Sid Bagbay
 Rosemary Eliot as Liz
 Paul Vaughn as Oscar Preeble
 Gordon Devol as Bellboy
 Stefani Warren as Connie Dodson
 Bobby Pickett as Roy Dodson (as Bob Pickett)
 Maggie Malooly as Madge Bagby
 Nicky Blair as Waiter
 Chet Stratton as Mr. Pomeroy
 Vivian Rhodes as Beauty Operator

See also
 List of American films of 1969

References

1969 television films
1969 films
1969 comedy films
American comedy television films
ABC Movie of the Week
Films directed by Harry Falk (director)
1960s English-language films
1960s American films